The 2014 Big East men's basketball tournament, officially known as the 2014 Big East Championship, was the 35th overall edition of the Big East men's basketball tournament, but the first of the current Big East Conference. It determined the recipient of the conference's automatic bid to the 2014 NCAA tournament, as well as one of the two (or more) officially recognized conference champions for the 2013–14 Big East Conference men's basketball season (like most NCAA Division I conferences, the Big East recognizes both the regular-season and tournament winners as conference champions).  It was held at Madison Square Garden in New York City.

The 2013 tournament was the last tournament for the Big East in its original form. Following a prolonged period of turnover in the conference membership, culminating in a split of the conference along football lines effective in July 2013, the Big East name was assumed by the seven schools of the original Big East that do not sponsor FBS football (a group colloquially called either the "Basketball 7" or the "Catholic 7").  The FBS schools retained the old Big East's structure and charter and joined with several other schools to form the American Athletic Conference.  As part of the deal, the new Big East retained the rights to the conference tournament in New York City, even though The American is the old Big East's legal successor.

Seeds

Schedule

Bracket

All-tournament team
LaDontae Henton, Providence
Austin Chatman, Creighton
Doug McDermott, Creighton
Semaj Christon, Xavier
Gene Teague, Seton Hall

Dave Gavitt Trophy (Most Outstanding Player)
Bryce Cotton, Providence

References

Tournament
Big East men's basketball tournament
College sports tournaments in New York City
Basketball competitions in New York City
Sports in Manhattan
Big East men's basketball tournament
Big East men's basketball tournament
2010s in Manhattan